In economics, search and matching theory is a mathematical framework attempting to describe the formation of mutually beneficial relationships over time. It is closely related to stable matching theory. 

Search and matching theory has been especially influential in labor economics, where it has been used to describe the formation of new jobs. Search and matching theory evolved from an earlier framework called 'search theory'. Where search theory studies the microeconomic decision of an individual searcher, search and matching theory studies the macroeconomic outcome when one or more types of searchers interact. It offers a way of modeling markets in which frictions prevent instantaneous adjustments of the level of economic activity. Among other applications, it has been used as a framework for studying frictional unemployment.

One of the founders of search and matching theory is Dale T. Mortensen of Northwestern University. A textbook treatment of the matching approach to labor markets is Christopher A. Pissarides' book Equilibrium Unemployment Theory. Mortensen and Pissarides, together with Peter A. Diamond, were awarded the 2010 Nobel Prize in Economics for 'fundamental contributions to search and matching theory'.

The matching function
A matching function is a mathematical relationship that describes the formation of new relationships (also called 'matches') from unmatched agents of the appropriate types. For example, in the context of job formation, matching functions are sometimes assumed to have the following 'Cobb–Douglas' form:

A matching function is in general analogous to a production function. But whereas a production function usually represents the production of goods and services from inputs like labor and capital, a matching function represents the formation of new relationships from the pools of available unmatched individuals. Estimates of the labor market matching function suggest that it has constant returns to scale, that is, .

then to calculate the change in employment from one period to the next we must add the formation of new matches and subtract off the separation of old matches. A period may be treated as a week, a month, a quarter, or some other convenient period of time, depending on the data under consideration. (For simplicity, we are ignoring the entry of new workers into the labor force, and death or retirement of old workers, but these issues can be accounted for as well.) Then given the matching function described above, the dynamics of employment over time would be given by

For simplicity, many studies treat  as a fixed constant. But the fraction of workers separating per period of time can be determined endogenously if we assume that the value of being matched varies over time for each worker-firm pair (due, for example, to changes in productivity).

Applications
Matching theory has been applied in many economic contexts, including:
Formation of jobs, from unemployed workers and vacancies opened by firms
Allocation of loans from banks to entrepreneurs
The role of money in facilitating sales when sellers and buyers meet

Controversy
Matching theory has been widely accepted as one of the best available descriptions of the frictions in the labor market, but some economists have recently questioned its quantitative accuracy. While unemployment exhibits large fluctuations over the business cycle, Robert Shimer has demonstrated that standard versions of matching models predict much smaller fluctuations in unemployment.

See also

 Search theory
 Beveridge curve
 Labor economics
 Monetary economics
 Nash bargaining game
 Matching (graph theory)
 Optimal matching

References

Labour economics
Microeconomic theories
Mathematical and quantitative methods (economics)